David Freed may refer to:
David Freed (author) (born 1954), American author, educator, journalist and screenwriter
David Freed (attorney), District Attorney of Cumberland County, Pennsylvania
David Freed (printmaker) (born 1935), American artist